Drume is a village in the municipality of Tuzi, Montenegro. It is located close to the Albanian border.

Demographics
According to the 2011 census, its population was 164, all but one of them Albanians.

References

Populated places in Tuzi Municipality
Albanian communities in Montenegro